After a COVID-19 pandemic enforced break in 2020, the third season of The Great Kiwi Bake Off was filmed in 2021 at Parihoa Farm in Muriwai instead of the usual location, South Auckland’s Puketutu Island Estate. This season premiered on 14 October 2021 on TVNZ 1 with Sproull, Sami, Brettschneider and Fleischl returning in their respective roles.

Mental Health Doctor, Alby Hailes, won the third season with Courtnay Fafeita and Jasmin Hohaia finishing as runner-ups.

Bakers
Ages, names, and hometowns stated are at time of filming.

Bakers progress

Colour key:

 Baker was one of the judges' least favourite bakers that week, but was not eliminated.
 Baker was one of the judges' favourite bakers that week, but was not the Star Baker.
 Baker got through to the next round.
 Baker was eliminated.
 Baker withdrew from the competition.
 Baker was the Star Baker.
 Baker was a runner-up.
 Baker was the season's winner.

Episodes

 Baker eliminated/withdrew
 Star Baker
 Winner

Episode 1: Cake
For the signature challenge, the bakers had to bake a vertical cake in two hours. For the technical challenge set by Sue, the bakers had two hours to bake a vegan apple cake. For the showstopper challenge, the bakers had to bake a "super size me cake", a large version of something of significance to the bakers, in four hours.

Episode 2: Biscuit
For the signature challenge, the bakers had to bake twelve melting moments in ninety minutes. For the technical challenge set by Sue, the bakers had two hours to bake chocolate marshmallow teacakes. For the showstopper challenge, the bakers had to bake a biscuit chandelier in three-and-a-half hours.

Episode 3: Aotearoa
For the signature challenge, the bakers had to bake sixteen chocolate brownies in ninety minutes. For the technical challenge set by Dean, the bakers had two hours to bake Kawakawa pockets with Horopito relish. For the showstopper challenge, the bakers had to bake a cake made to resemble a New Zealand landmark in four-and-a-half hours.

Episode 4: Savoury 
For the signature challenge, the bakers had to bake eight savoury doughnuts in two-and-a-half hours. For the technical challenge set by Dean, the bakers had two-and-a-half hours to bake eight pretzels. For the showstopper challenge, the bakers had to bake a decorated focaccia in four hours.

Episode 5: Fresh
For the signature challenge, the bakers had to bake twelve vegan slices in two-and-a-half hours. For the technical challenge set by Dean, the bakers had two-and-a-half hours to bake a vegetable spiral tart. For the showstopper challenge, the bakers had to bake a fruit pie in three-and-a-half hours.

Episode 6: Dairy
For the signature challenge, the bakers had to bake twelve choux au craquelins in two hours. For the technical challenge set by Sue, the bakers had two hours to bake a Portuguese milk pudding. For the showstopper challenge, the bakers had to bake a hand-painted two-tier dairy cake in four hours.

Episode 7: Bread
For the signature challenge, the bakers had to bake eight vegetarian stuffed flatbreads in ninety minutes. For the technical challenge set by Dean, the bakers had two-and-a-half hours to bake a braided babka. For the showstopper challenge, the bakers had to bake an animal bread sculpture in four-and-a-half hours.

Episode 8: Chocolate (Semi-Final)
For the signature, the bakers had to bake twelve chocolate biscuit bars in two-and-a-half hours. For the technical challenge set by Dean, the bakers had one hour to bake chocolate fondant. For the showstopper challenge, the bakers had to bake a multi-tiered chocolate cake in four hours.

Episode 9: Final
For the signature, the bakers had to bake 12 petit fours in two-and-a-half hours. For the technical challenge set by Sue, the bakers had three hours to bake a cassata. For the showstopper challenge, the bakers were given the freedom to bake anything they wanted provided that it was at least 40 centimeters tall and had at least one cake element in five hours.

References

TVNZ original programming
TVNZ 1 original programming
2021 New Zealand television seasons